I Walk Among You is a single by the American heavy metal band Iced Earth. Released on June 13, 2008, the single marked the return of long-time vocalist Matt Barlow, who originally left the band in 2003, but later returned in 2007.

I Walk Among You features four songs. A new song titled "I Walk Alone" (which was later included on the band's next full-length album The Crucible of Man) as well as three previously released songs re-sung by Barlow, all of which have also been remixed and re-mastered. One of the previously released songs, "A Charge to Keep", was initially released exclusively through the iTunes version of the single, although it later appeared on the Box of the Wicked compilation some time later.

A music video was also planned for the track "I Walk Alone", but due to some unknown issues with record company SPV, the plan never materialized. According to rhythm guitarist Jon Schaffer, the video was going to feature Set Abominae (the central figure of Schaffer's Something Wicked Saga, of which "I Walk Alone" is a part of) in an inter-dimensional world.

Track listing

Personnel 

Iced Earth

Jon Schaffer – rhythm guitar, lead guitar, bass, backing vocals, co-producer
Matt Barlow – lead vocals
Troy Seele – lead guitar
Brent Smedley – drums

Guest musicians
Dennis Hayes − bass (on "The Clouding")

 Other personnel
Jim Morris - co-producer, engineer 
Nathan Perry - cover and inner sleeve art
Felipe Machado Franco – cover and inner sleeve art, layout
David Newman-Stump - inner sleeve art

References

2008 singles
Iced Earth songs
2007 songs
Songs written by Jon Schaffer